HB Wall's is an ice cream brand in Northern Ireland and is part of the Unilever Group's heartbrand ice cream brand. 

HB and Wall's ice cream have been sold together in Northern Ireland and promoted together as HB Wall's.

External links
 HB
 Wall's

Unilever brands
Companies of Northern Ireland
Brands of Northern Ireland